Luka Mladenovic (born 27 May 2004) is an Austrian competitive swimmer. At the 2022 World Junior Championships, he won the gold medal and world junior title in the 100-metre breaststroke, the silver medal in the 200-metre breaststroke, and the bronze medal in the 50-metre breaststroke. He is a 2022 European Junior Championships silver medalist in the 200-metre breaststroke.

Background
Mladenovic was born 27 May 2004 in Austria. He trains with SU Generali Salzburg swim club, in Salzburg, under the guidance of coach Plamen Ryaskov.

Career

2021
On 17 May, Mladenovic placed 61st in the 100-metre breaststroke with a time of 1:03.10 at the 2020 European Aquatics Championships, contested at Danube Arena in Budapest, Hungary. Two days later, he placed 41st in the 200-metre breaststroke with a time of 2:16.87. At the 2021 European Junior Swimming Championships, held approximately two months later in Italy, Rome, he placed fourth in the 100-metre breaststroke, fourth in the 200-metre breaststroke, eleventh in the 4×100-metre medley relay, seventeenth in the 4×100-metre mixed medley relay, 53rd in the 50-metre butterfly, and did not start the 50-metre breaststroke.

2022

2022 European Junior Championships
At the 2022 European Junior Swimming Championships, held in July in Otopeni, Romania, Mladenovic won the silver medal in the 200-metre breaststroke with a time of 2:13.21, finishing less than two-tenths of a second behind gold medalist Lucien Vergnes of France. He also placed seventh in the final of the 100-metre breaststroke with a 1:02.48, placed seventh in the 200-metre individual medley in the semifinals with a personal best time of 2:03.79 before withdrawing from competing in the final, and placed fifteenth in the 50-metre breaststroke with a time of 28.68 seconds.

2022 European Aquatics Championships
At the 2022 European Aquatics Championships, with pool swimming competition at Foro Italico in mid-August, Mladenovic started off with a 30th-place ranking in the preliminary heats of the 100-metre breaststroke on day one with a time of 1:02.46. Two days later, he achieved a 23rd-place ranking in the 200-metre breaststroke with a time of 2:15.98, which was the fastest time by an Austrian in the event at the 2022 Championships. On 15 August, two days later, he ranked 40th in the preliminary heats of the 50-metre breaststroke with a time of 29.06 seconds and did not advance to the semifinals. For his final event of the championships, he placed 19th in the preliminary heats of the 200-metre individual medley one day later with a 2:06.00, ranking as the fastest Austrian in the event.

2022 World Junior Championships

Following his results at the 2022 European Junior Swimming Championships, Mladenovic entered to compete the same repertoire, 50-metre breaststroke, 100-metre breaststroke, 200-metre breaststroke, and 200-metre individual medley, at the 2022 FINA World Junior Swimming Championships, held in August and September in Lima, Peru. On the morning of the second day of competition, he placed twelfth in the 200-metre individual medley, finishing with a time of 2:04.90. Later in the day, in the evening finals session, he won the gold medal in the 100-metre breaststroke with a personal best time of 1:01.30, finishing 0.34 seconds ahead of silver medalist Uroš Živanović of Serbia and 1.50 seconds ahead of Filip Urbanski of Poland. Two days later, he won the silver medal in the 200-metre breaststroke, achieving a second-place finish with a personal best time of 2:12.94, which was 0.13 seconds behind gold medalist Asahi Kawashima of Japan. In the final of his fourth and final event, the 50-metre breaststroke on 4 September, he won the bronze medal in the 50-metre breaststroke, this time finishing 0.62 seconds behind gold medalist Uroš Živanović of Serbia with a personal best time of 28.32 seconds. After the Championships, when he returned to his training base in Austria, Mladenovic received a welcome home reception at his swim club.

2023
At the 2023 Salzburg Indoor Short Course Swimming Championships in February in Hallein, Mladenovic won ten titles in individual events, which spanned freestyle (100-metre, 200-metre, 400-metre), backstroke (100-metre), breaststroke (50-metre, 100-metre, 200-metre), butterfly (50-metre), and individual medley (100-metre, 200-metre) disciplines.

International championships (50 m)

Personal best times

Long course meters (50 m pool)

References

External links
 

2004 births
Living people
Sportspeople from Salzburg
Austrian male breaststroke swimmers
Austrian male medley swimmers
21st-century Austrian people